Lillehammer Tilskuer was a Norwegian newspaper, published in Lillehammer in Oppland county.

History and profile
The paper was started in 1837 as Oplands-Tidende, changed its name to Lillehammer Tilskuer in 1841 and became affiliated with the Conservative Party. From 1945 it cooperated with the Centre Party newspaper Gudbrandsdølen, and in 1990 they formally merged to form Gudbrandsdølen Lillehammer Tilskuer—in 1997 merged with Dagningen to form Gudbrandsdølen Dagningen (GD).

References

1837 establishments in Norway
1990 disestablishments in Norway
Conservative Party (Norway) newspapers
Defunct newspapers published in Norway
Mass media in Lillehammer
Norwegian-language newspapers
Newspapers established in 1837
Publications disestablished in 1990